Saules may refer to several places:

in France
Saules, Doubs, a commune of the Doubs département
Saules, Saône-et-Loire, a commune of the Saône-et-Loire département

in Switzerland
Saules, Switzerland, a municipality in the canton of Berne
Saules, Neuchâtel, a village in the municipality of Fenin-Vilars-Saules

See also
Saule (disambiguation)